This is a list of the main career statistics of professional Belgian tennis player Kirsten Flipkens.

Performance timelines

Only main-draw results in WTA Tour, Grand Slam tournaments, Fed Cup/Billie Jean King Cup and Olympic Games are included in win–loss records.

Singles

Doubles

Mixed doubles

Significant finals

Grand Slam finals

Mixed doubles: 1 (runner-up)

WTA career finals

Singles: 4 (1 title, 3 runner-ups)

Doubles: 15 (7 titles, 8 runner–ups)

WTA 125 finals

Singles: 1 (title)

ITF Circuit finals

Singles: 25 (13 titles, 12 runner–ups)

Doubles: 2 (2 titles)

WTA Tour career earnings
As of 29 August 2022
{|cellpadding=3 cellspacing=0 border=1 style=border:#aaa;solid:1px;border-collapse:collapse;text-align:center;
|-style=background:#eee;font-weight:bold
|width="90"|Year
|width="100"|Grand Slam <br/ >titles'|width="100"|WTA <br/ >titles
|width="100"|Total <br/ >titles
|width="120"|Earnings ($)
|width="100"|Money list rank
|-
|2009
|0
|0
|0
| align="right" |185,953
| 97
|-
|2010
|0
|0
|0
| align="right" |202,216
| 91
|-
|2011
|0
|0
|0
| align="right" |n/a
| n/a
|-
|2012
|0
|1
|1
| align="right" |n/a
| n/a
|-
|2013
|0
|0
|0
| align="right" |1,144,247
| 20
|-
|2014
|0
|0
|0
| align="right" |553,201
|48
|-
|2015
|0
|0
|0
| align="right" |307,927
|105
|-
|2016
|0
|1
|1
| align="right" |392,045
|86
|-
|2017
|0
|1
|1
| align="right" |515,984
|69
|-
|2018
|0
|2
|2
| align="right" |643,250
|59
|-
|2019
|0
|1
|1
| style="text-align:right" |702,391
|58
|-
|2020
|0
|0
|0
| align="right" |325,900
|71
|-
|2021
|0
|0
|0
| style="text-align:right" |147,651
|198
|-
|2022
|0
|0
|0
| style="text-align:right" |401,437
|86
|- style="font-weight:bold;"
|Career
|0
|6
|6
| align="right" |6,036,281
| 107
|}

Head-to-head
Record against top 10 playersFlipkens's record against players who have been ranked in the top 10. Active players are in boldface.''

Top 10 wins

Notes

References

Flipkens, Kirsten